Steven Richard Baker (born 8 September 1978 in Pontefract, West Yorkshire) is an English footballer who played as a defender for Middlesbrough, Huddersfield Town, Darlington and Hartlepool United.

Baker made his debut for Middlesbrough in the 1997-98 campaign, and went on to make five league appearances that season as they were promoted to the Premier League. The following season he made just two Premier League appearances. He suffered two cruciate ligament injuries in the space of three years.

Baker also represented the Republic of Ireland under-21 team over a five-year period, earning over 35 caps. Baker joined Scarborough, initially on loan from Middlesbrough, in 2001, and went on to make more than 100 Conference appearances for them. He was released at the end of the 2005–06 season. He signed for Gateshead in July 2006, but missed the whole of the 2007–08 season with injury.

References

External links

1978 births
Living people
Sportspeople from Pontefract
English footballers
Middlesbrough F.C. players
Hartlepool United F.C. players
Huddersfield Town A.F.C. players
Darlington F.C. players
Scarborough F.C. players
Gateshead F.C. players
Premier League players
English Football League players
Northern Premier League players
Newcastle Blue Star F.C. players
Association football defenders